The Story Goes... is the third studio album by English singer Craig David, released on 6 September 2005 by Warner Bros. Records in the UK. The album entered the UK Albums Chart and peaked at number 5 in late 2005. The album peaked at number 9 on the Australian ARIA Albums Chart around the same time. It was not released in United States, partly due to Atlantic Records' uncertainty over whether the album was the right material for that market. Ultimately, in 2007, the album was released digitally and as an import in American record stores. The album sold over 500,000 copies worldwide.

Recording
A promotional sampler for the album, entitled The Story Goes... and More, was distributed to radio stations prior to the album's release. This version contains snippets of unfinished tracks "Girls Around the World" and "My Friend, Let Me Down", as well as two full unreleased tracks – "Save the World" and "Cocoa Butter", plus an unreleased remix of "Don't Love You No More (I'm Sorry)", featuring American rapper Nelly. A digital version of this sampler surfaced online several years later, and incorrectly adds four previously released bonus tracks – "Key to My Heart" (from the American version of David's debut album, Born to Do It), "Apartment 543" (the B-side from David's debut single, "Fill Me In"), a remix of "Fill Me In", and "Four Times a Lady" (the B-side from "What's Your Flava?" and a bonus track from the Japanese version of Slicker Than Your Average). These tracks do not appear on the original sampler.

Critical reception
AllMusic rated the album 3 out of 5, and said of the record: "Picking himself up and signing to Warner Bros. Records after the demise of his Wildstar/Telstar record label, David offers The Story Goes... as a very personal album filled with his own experiences over the past few years, including his own relationship breakdown in "Don't Love You No More (I'm Sorry)," being mesmerized by a woman during his partying phase on the tracks "Hypnotic" and "Just Chillin'," and another doomed liaison on the song "One Last Dance." The song "Johnny" delves deeper into his past as he explores the subject of bullying, and the line "I didn't want to tell you anything in case it made things worse" would strike a chord with many a victim. David has a unique style of singing more words than should have been able to fit into each line, but it works for him. "Separate Ways" is back to "Fill Me In" standards, and he also has a habit of answering his own lines through a voicebox, as on "Thief in the Night." He strays into Enrique Iglesias territory on the song "Unbelievable," but without the smoldering Latin passion. Produced by long-term David collaborator Mark Hill, The Story Goes... appears to fall between an urban R&B-flavored Usher-styled album and his earlier more hip-hop-influenced work with the Artful Dodger. It couldn't be both."

Track listing

Personnel
Credits adapted from album’s liner notes.

Craig David - vocals (all tracks), producer (tracks 3, 7, 9, 10)
Alex Dromgoole - mixing assistant (tracks 1-7, 9, 10, 13, 14)
Lee Groves - producer (track 10), programming (tracks 1-7, 9, 10, 13, 14)
Rob Haagart - mixing assistant (tracks 1-7, 9, 10, 13, 14)
Mark Hill - producer (tracks 1, 2, 4-6, 13, 14)
Harvey Mason Jr. - producer (tracks 11, 12)
Rick Nowels - producer (tracks 3, 7, 9)
Aaron Renner - assistant engineer (tracks 11, 12)
Dave Russell - mixing (tracks 11, 12)
Philip Sheppard - string arrangement (track 8)
Alex Smith - assistant engineer (track 8)
Mark "Spike" Stent - mixing (tracks 1–7, 9, 10, 13, 14)
Ren Swan - mixing (track 8)
Mark Taylor - producer, mixing, and string arrangements (track 8)
Damon Thomas - producer (tracks 11, 12)
David Treahearn - mixing assistant (tracks 1–7, 9, 10, 13, 14)
Tim Young - mastering

Charts

Weekly charts

Year-end charts

Certifications

References

2005 albums
Albums produced by the Underdogs (production team)
Craig David albums
Albums produced by Mark Taylor (music producer)